Hilarographa pahangana is a species of moth of the family Tortricidae. It is found in Malaysia.

The wingspan is about 20 mm. The forewings have an orange ground colour, represented by two basal stripes, transverse lines and spots in dorso-postmedian half of the wing, three oblique lines beyond the costal divisions and two weak terminal lines. The divisions and their lines are white. The dorso-terminal area is orange with two brown spots. The hindwings are dark brown with white fascia along the median cell. Adults are day-flying.

Etymology
The species name refers to the type locality, West Pahang.

References

Moths described in 2009
Hilarographini